Thomas Hart Benton is a 1988 documentary film  about painter Thomas Hart Benton by Ken Burns.

Summary
His burly, energetic and uncompromising paintings are celebrated in this bittersweet story of an extraordinary American artist who depicted 
a self-reliant country in the Great Depression.

Availability
Released on DVD individually on November 12, 2002 by Warner Home Video. Released as part of Ken Burns America DVD set on September 28, 2004.

See also
American realism
Ashcan School

External links
Thomas Hart Benton on PBS

Thomas Hart Benton on WTTW

References

Films directed by Ken Burns
1988 films
American documentary television films
Documentary films about painters
1988 television films
1980s English-language films
1980s American films